PM or pm (also written P.M. or p.m.) is an abbreviation for Latin post meridiem, meaning "after midday" in the 12-hour clock.

PM or Pm or pm may also refer to:

Arts and entertainment
Palm mute, a guitar playing technique
PM (radio program), Australian current affairs radio program
PM (BBC Radio 4), UK
PM Magazine, an American TV news program (1976–1991). 
PM (newspaper), US (1940–1948)
PM Press, an American publishing company
Project Mayhem, a “fictional conspiracy” created in the Chuck Palahniuk 1996 novel Fight Club and 1999 movie of the same name
 PM a rock band featuring british drummer Carl Palmer.

Business and economics

Businesses
P.M. Place Stores, a former US chain of discount stores
Pere Marquette Railway, North America 1900–1947, reporting mark
Philip Morris International, a tobacco company

Terminology
Performance management of an organisation
Portfolio manager
Preventive maintenance
Project manager
Product manager

Government
Prime minister
Polícia Militar, Brazilian military police
Political-Military (Bureau of Political-Military Affairs), in the U.S. Department of State

People
P.M. (author) or p.m., pseudonym of Hans Widmer (born 1947), Swiss author
Pat Maloney Sr. (1924–2005), American trial lawyer

Science, technology, and mathematics

Biology and medicine
Plasma membrane, also known as cell membrane
Polymyositis, a disease
Poor metabolizer, a term used in pharmacogenomics to refer to individuals with little to no functional metabolic activity
Post-mortem
Precision medicine

Chemistry and materials science
Parametric Method 3 (PM3 (chemistry)), in computational chemistry
Particulate matter, microscopic particles suspended in the air
PM10, particulates smaller than 10 μm
Powder metallurgy, a method of fabricating metals
Promethium, symbol Pm, a chemical element

Computing
Particle mesh, an algorithm for determining forces
Perl module, file extension .pm
Private message, a private communication channel on a some platforms

Video games 
Paper Mario, a 2001 video game
The Paper Mario series

Units of measurement
Petametre (Pm), a length unit (1015 m)
Picometre (pm), a length unit (10−12 m)
Picomolar (pM), a unit of molar concentration

Vehicles
Martin PM, a version of the Naval Aircraft Factory PN flying boat
Toyota PM, a concept car
Pm36, a Polish steam locomotive
PM3, a Blue Origin propulsion module for a suborbital rocket

Weapons

Guns and mortars
Makarov PM (Pistolet Makarova), a Soviet and Russian pistol
Minebea PM-9, a Japanese submachine gun
PM-38, a Soviet light mortar
PM-63 RAK, Polish submachine gun
PM-84 Glauberyt, Polish submachine gun

PM md 96, a Romanian submachine gun

Precision Marksman (PM), a sniper rifle and precursor to the accuracy international arctic warfare rifle

Mines
PM-43 and PM-68 mine, Finnish anti-personnel mines
PM-60 mine, an East German anti-tank mine
PM-79 mine, a Bulgarian anti-personnel mine

Other uses in science, technology, and mathematics
PM-1, PM-2A, PM-3A, US Army portable nuclear reactors
Phase modulation, in signal processing
Polarization-maintaining optical fiber or PM fiber
Principia Mathematica, by Whitehead and Russell
The plus or minus sign, a symbol used in mathematics

Other uses
Passage Meditation, a form of meditation developed by Eknath Easwaran
Saint Pierre and Miquelon (ISO 3166-1 alpha-2 country code)
.pm, top-level domain (ccTLD) for Saint Pierre and Miquelon

See also